Nectars are a type of non-carbonated soft drink made by muddling the flesh of fruits.

In some countries, the beverage industry distinguishes nectars from drinks labeled as "juice". In the United States and the United Kingdom, the term "fruit juice" is restricted to beverages that are 100% pure juice, whereas a "nectar" may be diluted (to a degree limited by regulations) with water and contain additives besides fruit juice, including natural and artificial sweeteners, and preservatives. In New Zealand, the usage is reversed, with "juice" denoting a sweetened fruit drink, whereas nectar refers to pure fruit.

References

Juice
Non-alcoholic drinks